Puccinia malvacearum, also known as hollyhock or mallow rust, is a species within the genus Puccinia known for attacking members of the family Malvaceae. An autoecious pathogen, it can complete its life cycle using a single host.

Plants affected by the rust include Abutilon, Alcea (Hollyhock), Hibiscus, Lavatera, Malva, Malvastrum and Sphaeralcea.

Suggested control measures include sanitation (removal or destruction of affected plants or plant portions) or treatment with fungicides.

See also
 List of Puccinia species

References

 Hollyhock Rust: Puccinia malvacearum. University of Colorado Extension Service.
 Rust of Hollyhock. University of Nebraska Department of Plant Pathology.

External links
 

malvacearum
Fungal plant pathogens and diseases
Fungi described in 1852
Fungi of Europe
Fungi of North America
Galls
Leaf diseases
Ornamental plant pathogens and diseases